Gudeg is a traditional Javanese dish from Yogyakarta and Central Java, Indonesia. Gudeg is made from young unripe jack fruit (Javanese: gori, Indonesian: nangka muda) stewed for several hours with palm sugar, and coconut milk. Additional spices include garlic, shallot, candlenut, coriander seed, galangal, bay leaves, and teak leaves, the latter giving a reddish-brown color to the dish. It is often described as "green jack fruit sweet stew".

Serving
Served on its own, gudeg can be considered as a vegetarian food, since it only consists of unripe jackfruit and coconut milk. However, gudeg is commonly served with egg or chicken. Gudeg is served with white steamed rice, chicken either as opor ayam (chicken in coconut milk) or ayam goreng (fried chicken), telur pindang, opor telur or just plain hard-boiled egg, tofu and/or tempeh, and sambel goreng krechek a stew made of crisp beef skins.

Variations
There are several types of gudeg; dry, wet, Yogyakarta style, Solo style and East Javanese style. Dry gudeg has only a bit of coconut milk and thus has little sauce. Wet gudeg includes more coconut milk. The most common gudeg comes from Yogyakarta, and is usually sweeter, drier and reddish in color because of the addition of teak leaves as coloring agent. Solo gudeg from the city of Surakarta is more watery and soupy, with much coconut milk, and is whitish in color because teak leaves are generally not added. Yogyakarta's gudeg is usually called "red gudeg", while Solo's gudeg is also called "white gudeg". The East Javanese style of gudeg has a spicier and hotter taste compared to the Yogyakarta style gudeg, which is sweeter.

Gudeg is traditionally associated with Yogyakarta, and Yogyakarta is sometimes nicknamed "Kota Gudeg" (city of gudeg). The center of Yogyakarta gudeg restaurants is in the Wijilan area to the east side of the Yogyakarta Sultanate palace.

Availability and packaging
Gudeg can be packed into a besek (box made from bamboo) or kendil (clay jar), or canned. Canned gudeg can last up to one year.

Warung and restaurants serving gudeg can be found throughout Indonesian cities, such as Greater Jakarta. It is a popular dish in Javanese restaurants, and can be found in neighboring countries, such as Singapore.

See also

 Javanese cuisine
 Brongkos

Notes

External links 
 Gudeg Yogya Recipe
  Gudeg Purwokerto Recipe

Javanese cuisine
Vegetable dishes of Indonesia
Indonesian curries
Southeast Asian curries